The 2022–23 Israeli Basketball Premier League, for sponsorship reasons Ligat Winner, is the 69th season of the Israeli Basketball Premier League. The league started on October 7, 2022.

Format
The regular season will be played in a 22-round round-robin format. The top 6 finishers will play the 5 rounds "upper house", with the other 6 teams playing the 5 rounds "bottom house". The 6 upper group teams, joined by the top 2 teams from the bottom group, will play the quarter finals as Best-of-5 series. The semifinals and finals will be played as Best-of-3 series.

Teams

Maccabi Rishon LeZion has been relegated to 2022–23 National League after placing in the bottom place of the 2021–22 Premier League.
 Ironi Kiryat Ata has been promoted to the league after winning the 2021–22 National League.

Stadia and locations

Personnel and sponsorship

Managerial changes

Regular season

Rounds 1 to 22

Positions by round
The table lists the positions of teams after completion of each round. In order to preserve chronological evolvements, any postponed matches are not included in the round at which they were originally scheduled, but added to the full round they were played immediately afterwards.

Top-teams League Group

Positions by games played

Bottom-Teams League Group

Positions by Round

Awards

MVP of the Round

Monthly Awards

Player of the Month

Israeli Player of the Month

Coach of the Month

Israeli clubs in European competitions

 Bold – still active

References

 
Israeli Basketball Premier League seasons
Israel
Basketball
Current basketball seasons